United Nations Security Council Resolution 299, adopted unanimously on September 30, 1971, after examining the application of  Oman for membership in the United Nations, the Council recommended to the General Assembly that Oman be admitted.

See also
 List of United Nations Security Council Resolutions 201 to 300 (1965–1971)

References
Text of the Resolution at undocs.org

External links
 

 0299
 0299
 0299
September 1971 events